Novorossiyka is a rural locality (a selo) in Lebedinsky Selsoviet, Tabunsky District, Altai Krai, Russia. The population was 39 as of 2013. There are 2 streets.

Geography 
Novorossiyka is located 34 km east of Tabuny (the district's administrative centre) by road. Vozdvizhenka and Yermakovka are the nearest rural localities.

References 

Rural localities in Tabunsky District